The Difference Between Houses and Homes (2005) is a compilation by American indie band Cursive of some of their early material. It is subtitled Lost Songs and Loose Ends 1995-2001.  This compilation features songs from The Icebreaker 7", The Disruption 7", Sucker and Dry 7", and the split between Cursive and Small Brown Bike.

This album is the 70th release of Saddle Creek Records.

Track listing

Personnel: Tracks 1-7 and 9-12
 Tim Kasher – vocals, guitar
 Steve Pedersen – guitar, vocals
 Matt Maginn – bass, vocals
 Clint Schnase – drums

Personnel: Track 8
 Tim Kasher – vocals, guitar
 Ted Stevens – guitar, vocals
 Matt Maginn – bass, vocals
 Clint Schnase – drums
 Gretta Cohn - cello

Additional information
The artwork on the album and the story book that accompanies it was drawn by Yuriko Yoshino, a member of the Japanese punk band, Eastern Youth, with whom Cursive did a split.
All songs mastered by Doug Van Sloun at Studio B in Omaha, NE.

References

External links
Cursive official website
Saddle Creek Records
Cursive Profile on Punknews.org

2005 compilation albums
Cursive (band) albums
Saddle Creek Records compilation albums